Serge Strosberg (born in October, 1966) is a Belgian painter living in SOHO, NYC since 2008. His oil portraits have been featured at the Joods Historisch Museum in Amsterdam, The Norton House (West Palm Beach, Florida), the Musees de Pontoise, and The Felix Nussbaum Haus in Osnabrück Germany,

"Strosberg's style combines Expressionism and Realism (visual arts). ". Initially inspired by German Expressionism and the School of London painters such as Lucian Freud, Strosberg's portraits became those of an observer of NYC nightlife. Strosberg also paints Soho's fashion models.

Early life
Designer Jean-Paul Goude later evaluated Strosberg's thesis at the Ecole Superieure des Arts Graphiques, formerly Academie Julian. After taking Morphology classes at the École des Beaux-Arts, Strosberg went on to study privately with Joerg Hermle, a highly respected German Expressionist and art professor, who taught him a technique of painting with oil and egg tempera.

Following graduation, Serge Strosberg wrote and illustrated a children's book entitled In the Kingdom of Dragons about Darwin.

Strosberg illustrated another children's book entitled Rouquin des bois, about the importance of protecting Orangutan monkeys in Borneo. Strosberg also illustrated a history and culture of corn in Guatemala aimed at children called Les Jardins du Mais.

He painted portraits in Morocco, Japan, and the UK. Among his important works is the installation, Genealogy, a representation of the struggle during the Inquisition. This series was exhibited at the French Senate, the Alliance française in Miami, and the Joods Historisch Museum in Amsterdam. His Parisian series, Sins of Paris, is a contemporary reinterpretation of the Seven Deadly Sins starring actress and model Clemence Verniau.

Since Serge Strosberg moved to New York in 2008, the artist has become famous for painting and transforming all the fashion store windows surrounding his SoHo studio and beyond. Whether through classical representation or multi-media installations, he is an acute observer of the evolution of a society.

Education and awards 
 2010 Artist-in-residence at the Shanghai Himalayas Art Museum, Zhujiajiao branch, Shanghai, China
 2009 KiptonArt Rising winner, New York, NY.
 2007 SoHo Artist Certification granted by the City of New York
 2006 Artist-in-residence at the Lighthouse Center for the Arts Museum, Jupiter, Florida
 2001 Jan Cockx Prize, awarded by the director of Mukha, Museum of Contemporary Art, Antwerp, Belgium
 Allocation by the City Paris of a landmark artist's studio, designed by architect Massimiliano FuksasParis, France.
 1993 Academie Julian (E.S.A.G., Met de Penninghen) with honours, Paris, France
 1984 Grinnell College, Scholarship for Liberal Arts, Grinnell, Iowa

Exhibitions and collections

Selected solo exhibitions 

2013 
 Lionheart gallery, Pound Ridge, NY
 Armory Art Center, West Palm Beach, FL

2012 
 The Expressionist of Fashion, Galerie Brenart International, Brussels, Belgium
 SoHo's Muses, Poltrona Frau Showroom, New York, NY

2011 
 Berkeley College, New York, NY.
 Galerie Ludwig Trossaert, introduced by Ernest Van Buynder, Mukha – Museum for Contemporary Art Antwerp Belgium.

2009 
 Les Demoiselles de New York, URI Enterprises LLC, New York, NY.
 Of Men and Flowers, Norton House (West Palm Beach, Florida), in the Ann Norton Sculpture Gardens, Palm Beach, FL.
 Ritz-Carlton Spa Club, Jupiter, FL.

2007 
 Alliance française Gallery, Miami, FL.
 Elaine Baker Gallery, Boca Raton, Florida

2006 
 Community: Identity, Lighthouse Center for the Arts, Jupiter, FL.
 ArtSenat, Paris, France.

2005
 Espace Saint-Honore, sponsored by Galerie Cazeau-La Béraudiere, Paris, France.

2001 
 Galerie Philippe Frégnac, Paris, France.
 City Hall of the 1st Arrondissements

2000 
 Espace Rabin, Brussels, Belgium.

Museum exhibitions 
2011
 De Veronese a Matisse, Musee de Pontoise, Pontoise, France.

2010
 Shanghai Himalayas Art Museum, Zhujiajiao Branch, Shanghai, China.

2009
 Surfari, Lighthouse Center for the Arts Museum, Jupiter, FL.
 Recent acquisitions, Joods Historisch Museum, Amsterdam, the Netherlands.

2008
 Die Verbogene Spur- Jewish Paths to Modernity Felix Nussbaum Haus Museum, Osnabrück, Germany.
 Humanisme et Expressionisme, Musée de Pontoise, Pontoise, Paris, France.

2006
 Bible Museum, AmsterdamAmsterdam, Netherlands.

2005
 One Object: 2 Cultures, Jewish Museum, Brussels, Belgium.

Selected group exhibitions 

2012 
 Scope Miami with United Gallery, Florida
Baker Sponder Gallery, Boca Raton, Florida

2011 
 Awakenings, New Century Artists, New York, NY.
 Transformations, New Century Artists, New York, NY.
 Away From the Horde, group show at the Public Library, Miami-Dade County, FloridaMiami Dade.
 The Artist Project NY, Pier 92, New York, NY.
 LA Art show with Rosenberg Fine Art, Los Angeles, CA.

2010 
 Galerie Xavier Nicolas, Paris, France.
 A2zart Showroom, Paris, France.
 Looks Good on Paper, DFN Gallery, New York, NY.

2009 
 SoHo Mews showhouse with designer Thom Filicia, New York, NY.
 The Body, curated by Tzili Charney, at the 14th Street Y, New York, NY.

2008 
 Artistes et Médecins, École de Médecine, Paris, France.
 Kips Bay Showhouse, Manhattan House, New York, NY.

2006 
 Salon Comparaison, Grand Palais, Paris, France.

2005 
 Salon d'Automne, Paris, France.

2002 
 Bibliothèque Royale des Beaux-arts, Brussels, Belgium.

1992 
 Salon des Artistes Décorateurs, Grand Palais, Paris.

Art fairs 

2012
 Pool Art Fair, Flatiron Toshi Hotel, New York, NY.

2011
 The Artist Project (at Pier 92), New York, NY.
 Verge Art Brooklyn Fair, New York, NY.
 L.A. Art Show, Los Angeles Convention Center, CA

2009
 Palm Beach 3 Contemporary Art Fair, West Palm Beach, Florida, FL

2008
 Art Basel Miami Beach at the Setai hotel, presented by Kiptonart and Asprey Jewelry, Miami, FL.

2005
 Affordable Art Fair, London, United Kingdom.

2004 
 Contemporary Art Fair, New York, NY.
 Affordable Art Fair, Bristol, United Kingdom.

2001 
 ERT Art, European Fair, Breda, Netherlands.

Auctions 

2012
 Sunday's Group, New York, NY

2010
 Auction at Pierre Bergé & Associes, Brussels, Belgium.

2009
 The Art of Giving, auction at Christie's, New York, NY.

2008
 Auction at Artcurial, Paris, France.

Selected press 
 Atkinson, Jack A (2012) "Artists Show Their New Work," ArtsnFood.com, March 13.
 Clark, Philip F (2011)."The Artist Project: New Art for New Perspectives", The Artpoint.com, February 16.
 Johnson, Mary C (2011). " Art imitates Life" interview, "The Audra Catalog.com", February 22.
 Chapman, S (2010). "Read Between the Fiber Lines", " Review of Looks Good on Paper at DFN Gallery, Haute Living Magazine.com", illustrated, February 4.
 Wellerlane, C (2010). "NYC Amazons television interview with designer Richie Rich and singer Official Hank," Cognac's Corner Magazine, May 26.
 Zendai Art Museum Show in Zhu Jia Jio, Exhibition Review Artnews China, (2010) May.
 Serge Strosberg : NYC Amazons by Karen Biehl, Examiner.com, (2010) May 21.
 Fasano, N (2010). "Cabinet de Curiosites, including Serge Strosberg at Galerie Xavier Nicolas","The Curated Object, thecuratedobject.com", July.
 Engoren, J (2009). "High Art, High Society, review of Palm beach 3 Art Fair"," Miami Artzine", January.
 Engoren, J (2009)."Of Men and Flowers, review of solo exhibition at the Ann Norton Sculpture Gardens", "Art of the Times", February.
 Engoren, J (2009). "Inner Most Presence, Exhibition Review","Palm Beach Illustrated", March.
 Palm Beach Daily News Shiny Sheet, April.
 Engoren, J (2009)."Artsbuzz: Sculpture Gardens Feature Strosberg's Paintings", "Palm Beach Arts Paper", April 26.
 Zarrella, K (2009)."Serge Strosberg's Les Demoiselles de New York", "Dossier Journal", May 14.
 Sudalnik, A (2009)."Serge Strosberg's Synthetic Genealogy","Kiptonart.com", July 29.
 Johnson, R (2008)."New York PostThe New York Post Page 6", April 6.
 Waligora, C (2008). "Art Juif: Expressionisme et Neo-humanisme, review of Expressionisme et Humanisme at Musee Tavet-Delacour"," Azart Magazine International", May–June.
 Des Isles, B (2008). "Expressionisme et Humanisme", "Arts Actualite Magazine 84", May–June.
 Engoren, Jan (2008). "Sins in the City", "The Weekly Newspaper of Chelsea", Vol. 2, No. 24, March 14–20.
 Dusablon, C (2008). "Art Date New York", "Art and living.com", March 27.
 Africa Engo, S (2008)." Serge Strosberg's Pictures: I Bow Down to Your Talent", "Think MTV", March 28.
 Koulouris, C (2008)."Serge Strosberg; the Dorian Gray Syndrome"," scallywagandvagabond.com", November 9.
 Mc Gee, S (2008). "Next-Gen's givers"," Barron's Magazine", December 1.
 Chen, C (2008). "The Art of Partying at Art Basel/Miami","The Huffington Post, huffingtonpost.com", December 11.
 Engoren, J (2007)."Portrait of the Artist as a Young Man"," Art of the Times", January.
 Rogers, D (2007). "Mother to Lecture Sunday at Site of Son's Art Exhibition", "Palm Beach Daily News", January 6.
 Zaragovia, V (2007). "Serge Strosberg", "Miami Sun Sentinel (insert "Shalom Today")" January 17.
 Solo show at ArtSenat, interview on TFJ, Jewish television channel in France, June.
 Reality tv show on Fang Yang (2006). "Serge Strosberg's chinese model in Paris" for CCTV4, the national Chinese television channel.
 Documentary for Radio J (France, 2006).
 Tchoungui, E (2005). Serge Strosberg,"interview for FR5, French National Television Channel, UBIK, produced by Francoise Castro", January 20.
 TV5 (2005) French International Channel.Serge Strosberg.
 Grinberg, V (2005)."Life of Juliana Vieira Marques as Serge Strosberg's muse and wife", interview for reality TV show for Brazilian channel, Ok TV (produced by Globo Group).
 Interview on Europe 1, France, 2004.

References

Further reading
 Strosberg, S (2004)."Strosberg","editions Viridian, Paris, 
 Strosberg, E (2009)."The Human Figure and Jewish Culture", Abbeville Publishing Group", NYC,  p 171.
 Strosberg, E (2008). "Human Expressionism", "Somogy Art Publisher, Paris, P 123, 156, 160,161.
 Strosberg, E (2008)."Humanisme et Expressionisme", "Somogy editions d'Art", Paris, P 123, 156, 160,161.
 Strosberg, E (2000)."Art and Science", "Abbeville Inc", New York, p22, 51.
 Strosberg, E (1999)."Art et Science", "Editions UNESCO", Paris , p 22, 51.
 Martin Roman Deppner, Mark H.Gelber, Milly Heyd, Karl Janke, Kirsten Wagner (2008)."Die Verborgene Spur/Judische Wege durch die Moderne The Hidden Trace/Jewish Paths through Modernity", "rasch Verlag Bramsche", p201.

External links 
 Scallywag & Vagabond
 YouTube
 PBAP Archive
 Strosberge
 The A.U.D.R.A. Catalog
 Niews Blad
 Tablet Mag
 Curated Object
 Curated Object
 Online Barrons
 Dossier Journal
 Art Daily
 ATV
 Archives Lesior
 Art City
 RTBF
 Dailykos
 Art Observer
 ArtsnFood.Blogspot
 
 Handle Bar Magazine

 Sales of Pierre Bergé & Associé, (2010) December 10
 
 The Art of Giving, auction at Christie's, New York, NY

1966 births
Living people
Artists from Antwerp
Belgian emigrants to the United States
Belgian Jews
Jewish American artists
Artists from New York City
Belgian painters
Jewish painters
21st-century American Jews